Streptomyces ardesiacus is a bacterium species from the genus of Streptomyces.

See also 
 List of Streptomyces species

References 

ardesiacus
Bacteria described in 1955